Kai Alexander Kennedy (born 28 March 2002) is a Scottish footballer who plays as a winger for Falkirk, on loan from Rangers.

Kennedy previously had loan spells with Inverness Caledonian Thistle, Raith Rovers, Dunfermline Athletic and Hamilton Academical.

Career

Club
Kennedy came through the youth system at Rangers On 15 June 2018, Kennedy signed a three-year contract with the club. He made his first-team debut for Rangers on 17 January 2020 in a Scottish Cup match against Stranraer at Ibrox Stadium.

In late September 2020, it was reported by the Daily Record that Kennedy was being chased by multiple clubs including Sheffield United, Manchester City, Roma and Bayern Munich due to a contract dispute with Rangers. In October 2020 he was loaned to Inverness Caledonian Thistle in the Scottish Championship.
On 5 January 2021, Kennedy's loan at Inverness Caledonian Thistle was cut-short due to homesickness after Scotland was placed into another full lockdown, leaving him with the inability to travel between Inverness and his family in Glasgow.

On 8 January 2021, Kennedy signed a new contract with Rangers until the Summer of 2023. On the same day he signed a loan deal with Raith Rovers until the end of the season. On 22 July 2021, Kennedy returned to Fife with Dunfermline Athletic, signing a season-long loan deal. Kennedy was recalled by his parent club during the January transfer window. On 14 January 2022, Kennedy joined Scottish Championship side Hamilton Academical on loan for the remainder of the 2021–22 season.

In July 2022 Kennedy was loaned to Falkirk for the 2022–23 season.

International
Kennedy has represented Scotland at various youth levels up to under-19s. He was promoted to the under-21 squad in November 2020.

Career statistics

References

External links

2002 births
Living people
Scottish footballers
Footballers from Glasgow
Association football wingers
Rangers F.C. players
Inverness Caledonian Thistle F.C. players
Raith Rovers F.C. players
Dunfermline Athletic F.C. players
Hamilton Academical F.C. players
Scotland youth international footballers
Scotland under-21 international footballers
Falkirk F.C. players